The International Board Game Studies Association (IBGSA) is an academic professional association "devoted to the history and development of board games throughout the world". The IBGSA sponsors an annual scholarly conference, the BGSA Colloquium, as well as an academic peer-reviewed journal, Board Game Studies. The IBGSA's membership includes academics, museum curators, game designers, archivists, and collectors.

History 
The International Board Game Studies Association grew out of a colloquium organised by Dr Irving Finkel at the British Museum in 1990. A volume of papers related to this event was subsequently published by the British Museum Press as Ancient Board Games in Perspective. After the initial colloquium, Dr Alexander de Voogt, then of the University of Leiden in the Netherlands, convened a second colloquium, held at the University of Leiden in 1995. It was agreed by the members of the International Board Game Studies Association to meet biennially, and the next event was held at Leiden in 1997. An associated journal, sponsored by the University of Leiden, was established and the first volume of the Board Game Studies Journal was published in 1998.

The colloquium continued as a biennial forum, meeting in a different European city every two years, while the journal was published annually. From 2002, the colloquium became an annual event. The journal was discontinued as a physical publication after seven issues, but reconstituted as an online journal on the  De Gruyter platform. The annual Board Game Studies Colloquium is now the largest and single most important academic conference related to the study of board games. It has occasionally been hosted outside Europe, but it now established as a European event.

BGSA Colloquium History 
 1995 Leiden, The Netherlands
 1997 Leiden, The Netherlands
 1999 Florence, Italy
 2001 Fribourg, Switzerland
 2002 Barcelona, Spain
 2003 Marburg, Germany
 2004 Philadelphia, PA, USA
 2005 Oxford, UK
 2006 Ouro Preto, Brazil
 2007 St Pölten, Austria
 2008 Lisbon, Portugal 
 2009 Jerusalem, Israel
 2010 Paris, France
 2011 Bruges, Belgium
 2012 Munich, Bavaria
 2013 Ponta Delgaa, Azores
 2014 Ipswich, Suffolk
 2015 La Tour de Peilz, Switzerland
 2016 Nürnberg, Germany
 2017 Copenhagen, Denmark
 2018 Athens, Greece
 2019 Bologna, Italy
 2021 Paris, France
 2022 Leeuwarden, The Netherlands

Editorial Board 
 Jorge Nuno Silva, managing editor, University of Lisbon
 Alexander de Voogt, Museum of Natural History
 Carlos Pereira dos Santos, Centro de Estruturas Lineares e Combinatórias
 Fernanda Frazão, Apenas Livros
 Irving Finkel, British Museum
 João Pedro Neto, University of Lisbon
 Lídia Fernandes, Museu Romano
 Thierry Depaulis, Le Vieux Papier
 Ulrich Schaedler, :fr:Musée suisse du jeu

References

External links 
  (issues 1-9)
  (issues 10+)

International learned societies
 
Game studies